Tam Joseph (born 1947) is a Dominica-born British painter, formerly known as Tom Joseph. Described as "a uniquely talented, multidimensional artist" by art historian Eddie Chambers, "Tam Joseph has contributed a number of memorable paintings that locate themselves at the centre of socio-political commentary, often making work that shocks as it amuses, amuses as it shocks. Typical in this regard are paintings for which Joseph is universally loved and respected, such as 'Spirit of the Carnival' and 'UK School Report'."

Biography
Born in the Commonwealth of Dominica, Joseph came at the age of eight to London, where he still lives and works. He has been quoted as saying: "I am Windrush.... I didn't experience growing up as a Black child in England."

In 1967 he studied at the Central School of Art and Design, following this with a BA course at the Slade School of Art, University of London. He worked on Yellow Submarine, the 1968 animated film featuring the Beatles. He travelled in Europe and the Far East during the 1970s, and subsequently enrolled at the London College of Printing, graduating with a Dip AD in Typographic design. While working for the magazine Africa Journal in the late 1970s and early 1980s, he also travelled extensively in Africa. In 1979 he illustrated Buchi Emecheta's children's book Titch the Cat, published by Allison and Busby.

According to InIVA (the Institute of International Visual Art), "Joseph's work is often figurative and centred on the themes of reality, or rather the surreality, of life in the city."

In the documentary film Tam Joseph; Work in Progress he talks about his start as a painter and how he enjoys using tools he himself has made. This film was made over a period spanning seven years (2011–2017) and includes his work in sculpture, painting and graphic design.

He recognises Pablo Picasso as one of his main references in sculpture and admires how he was capable of looking at things and offering a new interpretation of them.

One of Joseph's best known paintings is his 1983 work Spirit of the Carnival (a reference to the Notting Hill Carnival), described by Time Out as a "jaw-dropping image of a carnival masquerader being kettled by the police". Another notable work, dating from 1983, is UK School Report, which depicts the passage of a Black youth through the British education system in three portraits that are captioned: "Good at sports", "Likes music" and "Needs surveillance".

His exhibitions have included: Caribbean Art at the Crossroads, El Museo del Barrio, Studio Museum in Harlem and Queens Museum, 2012; This is History, Gallery II and touring, 1998; Learning to Walk, Smith Art Gallery and Museum, Stirling, and touring; Us and Dem, Storey Institute, Lancaster, 1994; Back to School, The Showroom, London, 1989; Black Art: Plotting the Course, Oldham Art Gallery and touring, 1988; Big Yellow, Bedford Hill Gallery, 1988; Observers are Worried, Painting and Sculpture, St Pancras Library and Shaw Theatre, London, 1986; Monkey Dey Chop, Baboon Dey Cry, Barbican Arts Centre, London, 1984. His work was included in the major group exhibition No Colour Bar: Black British Art in Action 1960–1990 at London's Guildhall Art Gallery (10 July 2015 – 24 January 2016).

Tate Britain's landmark exhibition Life Between Islands: Caribbean-British Art 1950s – Now (1 December 2021–3 April 2022), celebrating 70 years of Caribbean-British art, prominently featured Joseph's work Spirit of the Carnival.

Selected group exhibitions

 1984: Into the Open: New Paintings, Prints and Sculptures by Contemporary Black Artists, Mappin Art Gallery, Sheffield
–– Creation For Liberation 2nd Open Exhibition By Black Artists, Brixton Art Gallery, London
 1985: Blackskin/Bluecoat, Bluecoat Gallery, Liverpool (4 April – 4 May 1985)
 1986: From Two Worlds, Whitechapel Art Gallery, London (30 July – 7 September 1986)
 1987: Double Vision, Cartwright Hall, Bradford
–– Prema Art Gallery, Gloucestershire, The Old Mill, Uley
 1988: Black Art: Plotting the Course, Oldham Art Gallery
–– The Artist Abroad, Lincolnshire, Usher Gallery
 1990: Steel by Design, Scunthorpe Museum
 1992: Blast from the Past, Glasgow Art Museum
––The Minories, Colchester
 1993: Greenwich Citizens Art Gallery
 1994: Us n' Dem, Lancaster City Art Galleries
 1995: ART'CRA, Accra, Ghana
–– Tricycle Theatre, London
–– Gallerie de la Salamandre, Nîmes
 1997: Bradford, Museums and Art Galleries
–– Mappin Art Gallery, Sheffield
 1998: Le Corps Humain, Gallerie des Arênes, Nîmes
 1999: Tullie House Art Gallery, Carlisle
 2000: Galerie HD Nick, Aubais
 2006: Gallerie de L'Ombres, Nîmes
 2007: Hawkins & Co, Elspeth Kyle Gallery, London
 2008: Hawkins & Co, Novas Contemporary Urban Centre, Liverpool
–– Crossing the Waters, Cartwright Hall, Bradford
 2009: The Tavern Gallery, Meldreth, Herts
–– Pic n'Mix, Woolworth, Leytonstone High Road, London
 2010: Gallery 101, Mansion House, London
 2012: Material Matters EastwingX, Courtauld Institute, London
–– Caribbean: Crossroads of the World, Queens Museum of Art New York; El Museo, New York; Studio Museum in Harlem
 2013: 50 Years post Birmingham, The Art Gallery: University of Maryland College
–– Tehran Calling, London Print Workshop
 2014: DAK'ART 2014, Senegal
–– Perez Museum of Art, Miami, Caribbean: Crossroads of the World
–– Tam Joseph: "Back in School", The Reading Room, London
–– "Where Do I End and You Begin?" Edinburgh Art Festival 
 2015: No Colour Bar: Black British Art in Action 1960–1990, Guildhall Art Gallery, London
 2020: Evolution - Tam Joseph Paintings, Felix & Spear Gallery, London
 2021–2022: Life Between Islands, Tate Britain

See also 
 BLK Art Group

References

External links
Tam Joseph official website 
Felix & Spear Gallery
Tam Joseph at Axisweb
Tam Joseph commentary, Calling Project.
 
 Tam Joseph, "Spirit of the Carnival", V&A.
 "Art of This World: Tam Joseph", Aker: Futuristically Ancient.
 "Tam Joseph - The Handmade Map of the World", 12 August 2014, YouTube.
 "Tam Joseph, Art Discussion: In Conversation with Adelaide Damoah", 31 March 2017.
  "Tam Joseph - Work In Progress", 5 December 2019, YouTube.

1947 births
Living people
Dominica artists
Alumni of the Slade School of Fine Art
Black British artists
20th-century English painters
English male painters
21st-century English painters
Dominica emigrants to England
Alumni of the Central School of Art and Design
Artists from London
21st-century English male artists
20th-century English male artists